Anna Lindholm (born 2 June 1965 in Malmö, Sweden) is a Swedish actress.

Filmography
 2006 – Frostbiten
 2003 - Ramona
 2001 – Spökafton
 1999 – En häxa i familjen
 1998 – Beck – Monstret
 1998 – S:t Mikael
 1996 – Svensson, Svensson
 1995 - Arne Anka - En afton på Zekes (Theatre)
 1995 – Tag ditt liv
 1994 – Den vite riddaren
 1993 – Drömmen om Rita
 1992 – Första Kärleken

External links

1965 births
Swedish actresses
Living people